The oxidoreductase FAD-binding domain  is an evolutionary conserved protein domain.
   
To date, the 3D-structures of the flavoprotein domain of Zea mays nitrate reductase and of pig NADH:cytochrome b5 reductase have been solved. The overall fold is similar to that of ferredoxin:NADP+ reductase: the FAD-binding domain (N-terminal) has the topology of an anti-parallel beta-barrel, while the NAD(P)-binding domain (C-terminal) has the topology of a classical pyridine dinucleotide-binding fold (i.e. a central parallel beta-sheet flanked by 2 helices on each side).

Examples 

Human genes encoding proteins containing this domain include:
 CYB5R1; CYB5R2; CYB5R4; CYB5RL;

References

Protein domains
Single-pass transmembrane proteins